CCTV-8 is the television drama channel of the CCTV (China Central Television) Network in the People's Republic of China.

External links
 tv.cctv.com/cctv8 

China Central Television channels
Television channels and stations established in 1994
1994 establishments in China